The White Octave was a rock band from Chapel Hill, North Carolina. The group was founded shortly after Steve Pederson left Cursive, and was initially a trio with Lincoln Hancock and Robert Biggers before Finn Cohen was added on guitar. They released two full-length albums and appeared on several compilations before finally breaking up. The founding member, Steve Pedersen (formerly of Slowdown Virginia/Cursive) went back to his hometown of Omaha, Nebraska to form the band Criteria. Robert Biggers and Finn Cohen went on to form The Nein. The group reunited to play in North Carolina in 2014.

Band members
Steve Pedersen - vocals, guitar
Lincoln Hancock - bass, vocals
Robert Biggers - drums
Finn Cohen - guitar

Discography

Albums
Style No. 6312 - (2000 · Deep Elm Records)
Menergy - (2001 · Initial Records)

Singles
Weight / Ebb And Flow (2001 - Moment Before Impact Records)

Splits
Sorry About Dresden/The White Octave (2000 · Tritone Records)

Compilations
Emo Diaries No. 5: I Guess this is Goodbye (2000)
Deep Elm Records Sampler 3: Sound Spirit Fury Fire (2001)
Deep Elm Records: Unreleased No. 2 (2002)
Emo is Awesome/Emo is Evil: Deep Elm Records (2002)
Bifocal Media: Kampai (2002)
Patchwork (2002)
Too Young to Die: Preventing Youth Suicide (2003)

References

External links
Deep Elm Records

Alternative rock groups from North Carolina
Indie rock musical groups from North Carolina
Musical groups from Chapel Hill-Carrboro, North Carolina